Tanglin Trust School (TTS) is an international school in Singapore that runs as a non-profit organisation. Established in 1925, Tanglin Trust School provides British-based learning with an international perspective for students aged 3–18. There are approximately 2,800 students at Tanglin, with 700 in the Infant School, 700 in the Junior School and 1,400 in the Senior School and Sixth Form. Each school has its own building and facilities within the one campus. 

Approximately 60–70% of students in the school are British passport holders. As of May 2014, 54 nationalities are represented.

History

The school was founded in 1925 by Anne Griffith-Jones. It is the oldest British international school in Southeast Asia. When it first opened, it operated from premises within the Tanglin Club. It began with five students, but soon began to grow rapidly. At the time, many British expatriates living in Singapore sent their children away to boarding school in Britain at an early age. The school offered the alternative of providing British-style education in Singapore, so parents could postpone boarding school until an older age.

In 1934, Griffith-Jones opened a second school – the Tanglin Boarding School in the Cameron Highlands. Again this was intended as a nearby alternative for expatriate families living in the region who would otherwise have to send their children to boarding schools in Britain. Many children who attended the school in Singapore up to the age of eight then went on to the boarding school in the Cameron Highlands, which catered for students up to the age of 13. However the school in Singapore continued to flourish.

The Japanese occupation of the Malay Peninsula in 1942 forced the closure of both schools, as British expatriates in the region (including Griffith-Jones) were interned by the Japanese. The schools reopened after the war. From 1948, the unsafe conditions created by Malayan Emergency meant the school in the Cameron Highlands had to be put under full-time armed guard and children were transported to and from school in armoured vehicles at the end and start of term. The Cameron Highlands School was eventually forced to close by the Federal Government for security reasons in 1950 and the school was sold to the British War Office.

In 1958, Griffith-Jones retired and sold the private company Tanglin School Ltd to the British European Association (now known as the British Association of Singapore) in Singapore. In 1961, governance of the school was handed over to a non-profit education Trust known as the Tanglin Trust Ltd.

In 1971, the Trust opened a second British international primary school in Singapore called Weyhill Preparatory School. Three years later the Trust also took over the running of another international school in Singapore called Raeburn Park School, which had been opened in 1954 by the Singapore Harbour Board for the children of its expatriate staff. In 1981, the three schools were merged into one at its present campus on Portsdown Road. Initially, the campus housed two largely separate-functioning infant and junior schools known as Tanglin Infant School and Tanglin Junior School. A separate nursery school (known as Winchester Nursery School) also operated at Alexandra Park for twenty years between 1976 and 1996, but this was moved to the new purpose-built Infant School on the Portsdown Road campus in 1996. In the late-1980s, the administration and curriculum of the schools was centralised under a single Head Teacher and in 1996 the name Tanglin Trust School was adopted.

Academics
The English National Curriculum provides the basis for the programmes of study. Infant School students are aged between 3 and 7 and the curriculum they follow is the Early Years Foundation Stage in Nursery and Reception followed by Key Stage 1 in Years 1 and 2. Students in the Junior School, aged between 7 and 11, follow Key Stage 2 in Years 3 to 6. Students in the Senior School, including those in the Sixth Form, are aged 11 to 18 years. They study Key Stages 3 in Years 7 to 9; Key Stage 4 in Years 10 and 11; and Key Stage 5 in Years 12 and 13. As students progress through Key Stage 3 to 5 of the English National Curriculum, they are presented with a widening choice of subjects to choose from for their General Certificate of Secondary Education (I/GCSE) and A Level or IB examinations. Tanglin's Infant, Junior and Senior Schools are inspected every three years by Ofsted British Schools Overseas (BSO). The school has been repeatedly described by UK inspectors as Outstanding, the highest possible grade.

Admissions criteria
To enter the school, students must have a level of English sufficient to access the curriculum. Students may be asked to submit a sample of work, attend an interview or complete an exam depending on the circumstances.

TTS Foundation Our World Projects
TTS Foundation Limited (TTS Foundation) was established in May 2012 and was registered as a charity in June 2013. It was set up as a fundraising entity and is managed by the Development Office at Tanglin. TTS Foundation currently has start-up funding which does not come from school fee income. It was established to support enrichment activities and projects beyond the regular curriculum and to enhance the educational experiences of students at Tanglin Trust School. It does this by administering the Our World Fund which support projects that benefit the school community. These range in nature and size and include a scholarship and awards programme as well as Our World projects. Each project has to qualify individually for funding and must adhere to Tanglin Trust School's mission statement

Alumni and Friends of Tanglin
The school has an alumni community which is designed to help current and former students stay in touch with each other and with Tanglin. Alumni from schools pre-dating Tanglin Trust School: Tanglin School, Tanglin Preparatory School (TPS), Weyhill Preparatory School (WPS), Raeburn Park School (RPS) and Winchester Nursery are encouraged to reconnect through the Tanglin Alumni community. Additionally there is a Friends of Tanglin network which is open to all current and former teachers, support staff, Governors and parents.

Notable alumni
Daniel Bennett – professional football player for the Singapore national football team and in Singapore's S.League
Ming Bridges – Singaporean singer-songwriter, actress and model
Romola Garai – British actress
Stuart Grimes – former Scottish Rugby captain
Blair McDonough – Australian actor
 Mimi Slinger – English actress
James Wong – botanist and BBC television presenter

See also

Education in Singapore
International Baccalaureate

References

External links
Official website

International schools in Singapore
British international schools in Asia
1925 establishments in Singapore
Educational institutions established in 1925